Coprophanaeoides is a genus of Scarabaeidae, more commonly known as scarab beetles.

References

Scarabaeidae genera